The 1964-65 season was Chelsea Football Club's 51st of competitive football, and their 38th in the English top flight.

Season summary

Chelsea were involved in a battle for the First Division championship with Manchester United and newly-promoted Leeds United. The three clubs also reached the semi-finals of the FA Cup, with the two Uniteds paired together while Chelsea faced off against reigning league champions Liverpool. A 2–0 defeat at Villa Park saw Chelsea's hopes of a league and cup 'double' evaporate, and their title hopes then nosedived with only two wins from the remaining eight league matches.

The season ended in controversy and ignominy after eight Chelsea players were alleged by manager Tommy Docherty to have broken a curfew imposed prior to their penultimate match, resulting in those responsible being sent back to London in disgrace. The Blues' heavily-weakened side were thrashed 6–2 by Burnley, and defeat to Blackpool in their final match meant Chelsea had to settle for a third place finish, five points behind the top two.

However, some consolation was gained from success in the nascent Football League Cup. Chelsea overcame Birmingham City, Notts County, Swansea Town, Workington and Aston Villa, before beating Leicester City 3–2 on aggregate in the final to claim the first domestic cup title in the club's history.

Results

First Division

League Cup

FA Cup

Squad
Players who made one appearance or more for Chelsea F.C. during the 1964-65 season

References

Soccerbase
Hockings, Ron. 100 Years of the Blues: A Statistical History of Chelsea Football Club. (2007)

Chelsea F.C. seasons
Chelsea